Oedura picta, the ornate velvet gecko, is a species of gecko endemic to Queensland  in  Australia. It, along with two other species (Oedura elegans and Oedura lineata), was first formally named in 2019.

References

Oedura
Geckos of Australia
Reptiles described in 2019
Taxa named by Conrad J. Hoskin